WSCI (89.3 FM) is a noncommercial Classical/News/Talk in Charleston, South Carolina featuring both Classical music as well as news and other programs from NPR.   The station is part of the statewide "Classical NPR network" from South Carolina Public Radio. There is only one locally produced program on this remotely fed station.

The station also simulcasts South Carolina Public Radio's all-news format on its second HD subcarrier. This was added to improve coverage of South Carolina Public Radio's news format in the Lowcountry, even though much of the market gets at least grade B coverage from sister station WJWJ-FM in Beaufort.

External links
South Carolina Public Radio

1986 establishments in South Carolina
NPR member stations
radio stations established in 1986
SCI